Blount (or Blunt) is a common surname of English derivation, meaning "blonde, fair" (Old French blund), or dull (Middle English blunt, blont)
 Anna Blount (1872–1953), physician, suffragist and birth control activist in the United States
 Bessie Blount Griffin, (1914–2009) an African American inventor
Charles Blount (deist), (1654–1693), author and son of Sir Henry Blount
 Charles Hubert Boulby Blount (1893-1940), English airman and cricketer
 Sir Christopher Blount (died 1601), companion of Sir Walter Raleigh and cousin of Charles Blount, 1st Earl of Devonshire
 Edward Blount, publishing partner for the First Folio of the works of Shakespeare
 Elizabeth Blount (1502–1540), mistress of Henry VIII and the mother of his illegitimate son, Henry FitzRoy, 1st Duke of Richmond and Somerset
 Eric Blount (born 1970), American football player 
 James Blount (disambiguation)
F. Nelson Blount, (1918–1967), President and founder of Blount Seafood Corporation, millionaire and collector of vintage steam locomotives and rail cars. 
 Henry Blount (knight), author of Voyage into the Levant (1635)
 James Henderson Blount (1837–1903), American politician
 Jibri Blount (born 1996), American basketball and football player
 Joey Blount (born 1998), American football player
 Keith Blount (born 1966), British admiral and Fleet Air Arm officer
 LeGarrette Blount (born 1986), American football player
 Mark Blount (born 1975), American basketball player
 Mel Blount (born 1948), American football player
 Richard Blount, S.J. (1565–1638), English Priest and Jesuit Provincial
 Roy Blount Jr. (born 1941), American humorist
 Sir Thomas Blount (died 1400), courtier, executed for his part in the Epiphany Rising
 Thomas Blount (1604–??), English soldier
 Thomas Blount (lexicographer) (1618–1679), English antiquarian and lexicographer
 Thomas Blount (1759–1812), American soldier
 William Blount (1749–1800), American politician
 W. Frank Blount (born 1938), American businessman
 William Grainger Blount (1784–1827), American politician
 Willie Blount (1768–1835), American politician
 Winton M. Blount (1921–2002), American industrialist and politician
 Michael Blount (1529–1597), English sheriff
 Blount baronets, English baronets of Sodington and Tittenhanger

English nobility, Barons Mountjoy and Earls of Newport in the English Peerage:
Walter Blount, 1st Baron Mountjoy (1420–1474)
Edward Blount, 2nd Baron Mountjoy (1467–1475)
John Blount, 3rd Baron Mountjoy (1445–1485)
William Blount, 4th Baron Mountjoy (1478–1534) scholar and chamberlain to Catherine of Aragon
Charles Blount, 5th Baron Mountjoy (1516–1544)
James Blount, 6th Baron Mountjoy (died 1581)
William Blount, 7th Baron Mountjoy (1561–1594)
Charles Blount, 1st Earl of Devon and 8th Baron Mountjoy (1562–1606), English courtier, soldier, and colonial administrator
Mountjoy Blount, 1st Earl of Newport (1597–1665)
Mountjoy Blount, 2nd Earl of Newport (1630–1674)
Thomas Blount, 3rd Earl of Newport (died 1675)
Henry Blount, 4th Earl of Newport (died 1679)

See also
Blunt (surname)
Blount (disambiguation)

References